Arnold Tawanda Matshazi (born 2 November 2003) is an English professional footballer who plays as a forward for Slough Town, on loan from Wycombe Wanderers.

Career
Matshazi began his career with Blackpool as a youth player, featuring for them in the EFL Youth Alliance, FA Youth Cup and Lancashire Youth Cup.

Matshazi joined Wycombe Wanderers in August 2022. He made his professional debut on 24 August 2022 as a substitute in a 3–1 loss against Bristol City in the EFL Cup second round.

On 14 October 2022, Matshazi joined National League South side Slough Town on a one-month loan deal.

Career statistics

References

External links

2003 births
Living people
English footballers
Blackpool F.C. players
Wycombe Wanderers F.C. players
Slough Town F.C. players
Association football forwards
National League (English football) players